Sir Gavin Harry Laird  (14 March 1933 – 26 October 2017) was a Scottish trade unionist, who became General Secretary of the Amalgamated Engineering and Electrical Union (AEEU) and a Member of the Court of the Bank of England.

Growing up in Clydebank he attended a local high school then began working for Singer. He became an Amalgamated Engineering Union (AEU) shop steward there, then convenor.

Three years after taking up a full-time position with the union, he was elected to the AEU executive and later elected AEU general secretary, remaining in that position after the merger which created the AEEU. He addressed the Confederation of British Industry annual conference in 1986 – an unusual move for a trade unionist at the time.

He appeared as a castaway on the BBC Radio programme Desert Island Discs on 25 October 1992, received an Honorary Doctorate from Heriot-Watt University in 1994, was made a Commander of the Order of the British Empire (CBE) under Margaret Thatcher's government and knighted in 1995 at the behest of Tony Blair.

He retired from the AEEU in 1995 and died in October 2017 at the age of 84 after a long illness.

References 

1933 births
2017 deaths
Commanders of the Order of the British Empire
General Secretaries of the Amalgamated Engineering and Electrical Union
General Secretaries of the Amalgamated Engineering Union
Knights Bachelor
People from Clydebank